In Greek mythology, Plexippus  or Plexippos (Ancient Greek: Πλήξιππος means "striking") is a name that refers to:

 Plexippus, a Pleuronian prince as the son of King Thestius of Pleuron and Eurythemis, daughter of Cleoboea. He was the brother of Althaea, Leda, Hypermnestra, Evippus, Eurypylus and Iphiclus. Together with his other brother Toxeus, Plexippus participated in the hunt for the Calydonian Boar. He was angry that the prize of the boar's hide had been given to a woman (Atalanta) by his nephew Meleager, who then killed him in the ensuing argument.
Plexippus, a Thracian prince as son of Phineus and Cleopatra, brother of Pandion. He and his brother were blinded by Phineus at the instigation of their stepmother Idaea.
Plexippus, an Egyptian prince as one of the sons of Aegyptus. He married (and was killed by) Amphicomone, daughter of Danaus.
Plexippus, an Arcadian prince as the son of the King Choricus, brother of Enetus and Palaestra.

Plexippus (spider) is also a genus of jumping spiders.

Notes

 References 

 Apollodorus, The Library with an English Translation by Sir James George Frazer, F.B.A., F.R.S. in 2 Volumes, Cambridge, MA, Harvard University Press; London, William Heinemann Ltd. 1921. ISBN 0-674-99135-4. Online version at the Perseus Digital Library. Greek text available from the same website.
 Gaius Julius Hyginus, Fabulae from The Myths of Hyginus translated and edited by Mary Grant. University of Kansas Publications in Humanistic Studies. Online version at the Topos Text Project.
 Maurus Servius Honoratus, In Vergilii carmina comentarii. Servii Grammatici qui feruntur in Vergilii carmina commentarii; recensuerunt Georgius Thilo et Hermannus Hagen. Georgius Thilo. Leipzig. B. G. Teubner. 1881. Online version at the Perseus Digital Library.
 Publius Ovidius Naso, Metamorphoses translated by Brookes More (1859-1942). Boston, Cornhill Publishing Co. 1922. Online version at the Perseus Digital Library.
 Publius Ovidius Naso, Metamorphoses.'' Hugo Magnus. Gotha (Germany). Friedr. Andr. Perthes. 1892. Latin text available at the Perseus Digital Library.

Princes in Greek mythology
Aetolian characters in Greek mythology
Arcadian characters in Greek mythology
Mythological blind people
Egyptian characters in Greek mythology
Thracian characters in Greek mythology